John Donald is a British jeweller - designer whose work is strongly identified in the 1960s and 1970s in London. Princess Margaret and the Queen Mother purchased works by John Donald in the 1960s, having been introduced to him by Antony Armstrong-Jones, 1st Earl of Snowdon.

Examples of Donald's work are held in the collections of Museum of Scotland, Edinburgh; Victoria & Albert Museum, London; and the collection of the Worshipful Company of Goldsmiths.

An elegant revolutionary

In his half-century as a working jeweller John Donald has been feted as an idealist, a pioneering designer, and as a craftsman. Part of a select group who revolutionised jewellery design in the early 1960s, he went on to establish a successful business and an international reputation. His work captures the late twentieth century ideals of glamour and modernity.

Born in 1928 to a golfing father and a socially ambitious mother, John Donald attended art college as a compromise between sport and university. He studied graphic design at Farnham, and in 1952 he was offered the chance to enrol in the Metalwork Department of the Royal College of Art. This change of direction was essentially a pragmatic one, as the young man was keen to experience London. But he soon discovered an affinity for working with metal that would shape the rest of his life.

At college John Donald joined a group of hard-working (and hard-playing) ex-servicemen, often staying in the studio late into the night. He shared digs in Chelsea with fellow metalwork students Robert Welch and Gerald Benney. All three friends would later become famous for their silver and jewellery designs.

He graduated in 1955, and left a year later with a first-class degree. However it was several years before he could establish himself as a jeweller, and in the meantime he was forced to support himself through a combination of male modelling and industrial design. In 1960 the proceeds from designing luggage and National Health spectacles at last allowed him to buy his own studio. A year later he entered five pieces in the seminal International Exhibition of Modern Jewellery 1890-1961, held at Goldsmiths' Hall, and by 1964 he could number Princess Margaret and the Queen Mother among his patrons.

John Donald's designs perfectly caught the mood of freedom and excitement which swept Britain during the 1960s. Using simple materials such as gold rod and uncut crystal, he created expressive, abstract pieces free from the conventions of shape and style which had constrained earlier jewels. He was one of a small group of craftsmen whose radical entries to the International Exhibition ushered in a new era of modern jewellery. Characterised by adventurous forms and textures, the movement deliberately avoided showcasing precious materials or artificially imposing a subject. It was, as the sponsors of the exhibition proclaimed, "as uninhibited as modern sculpture, or fashion; individual, imaginative and smart'.

Experimental techniques

John Donald's jewellery is characterised by the dynamic energy created by its unusual forms and textures. He started experimenting with gold and precious stones during the late 1950s, and his difficult circumstances during that time forced him to take creative new directions. In 1957 he bought a quantity of gold rods and chenier, a small-bore tubing supplied directly by bullion merchants. It was some of the only gold the struggling jeweller could afford, but by cutting it into angled lengths or fusing tiny cross-sections, he was able to create dramatic geometric patterns. The natural form of crystals was another source of inspiration. Less expensive and more diverse than conventional jewels, their planes and striations were echoed in his textured surfaces. One of his most distinctive motifs - the cube - directly developed from his use of square-shaped iron pyrites.

The experimentation continued when he moved into his own studio in 1960, and it was here that he created another important motif: the bead and cup. Pouring molten gold into cold water, he discovered that it divided into small beads, some of which caught bubbles of air and cooled into hollow cups. The beads were painstakingly soldered together, creating a complex surface of contrasting of convex and concave shapes. He later cast bead and cup sections, enabling him to use them in larger scale designs.

Beautiful, intricate and thoroughly modern, the jewels created with these techniques make a big impact using only simple components.

Crowns, shadows and the concern for texture

One of John Donald's signature techniques is the striking drum or crown mount. Framed by a protective basket of textured gold, gems are set at the end of tiny rods to form glittering openwork constellations. He has modestly said that the method was developed as a way round his lack of conventional skills, however fixing the narrow rods into their tiny screw-holes requires a high level of technical expertise. The mounts are wholly unique and allow a delicacy of setting almost impossible with more traditional designs.

The drums themselves reveal other John Donald trademarks: textured 'nugget flakes' and 'wavy rods'. Continuing his experiments with immersing molten metal in water, the young jeweller discovered he could use this process to produce small flakes whose nugget-like surface gave the gold an almost organic appearance. These could be used in a variety of forms, but they were especially effective when combined with the sinuous shapes of melted gold rod. Melting was also used to give other gold elements a fluid feel, especially in the "nugget-edged' apertures which appear in some of his most spectacular jewellery.

All these methods highlight John Donald's deep preoccupation with the effects of texture of light. Like many of his contemporaries, he rejected the monotony of traditional polished surfaces. Instead his work contrasts the glow of uneven metal with highly polished sheens and dazzling gemstones, the shadows cast by his three dimensional forms adding an extra element of drama.

A very fashionable craftsman

From the early 1960s John Donald's reputation grew rapidly. His work found favour with women of fashion as well as critics, and he was able to produce jewellery whose avant-garde design was matched only by the beauty of their precious materials. He married in 1962, and soon had two young children living above his Bayswater workshop.

By the middle of the decade both John Donald's business and his family were starting to outgrow his modest Bayswater workshop and premises above it, and he began searching for a new studio. The site he eventually chose was 120 Cheapside, a small shop at the front of the new Schroder's Bank building. This was a significant choice; by moving to a shop in the City he was opting not only to independently retail his work, but to do so away from the traditional hub of the West End. However he went ahead, and in 1968 opened a small but elegant gallery and workshop, delighting his landlords by bringing a working jeweller back to the Elizabethan 'Goldsmiths Row'.

The years that followed saw his business grow exponentially. He opened one retail shop in Bond Street in 1971, and another in Richmond in 1973. The former enterprise was a partnership with Tecla pearls; although lasting not much more than a year, it allowed him to develop his imaginative and sensitive use of the gems. The outlets enabled John Donald to bring his innovative designs to a wide audience of more ordinary clients as well as his grand patrons from the banking and aristocratic worlds.

Eastern colour and old-fashioned influences

John Donald travelled overseas right from the start of his career, building up his international profile by exhibiting and selling new work in Europe, America and Japan. However his most important links were with the Middle East, and it was this region which inspired many of his designs in the closing decades of the century.

He made his first visit there in 1969, holding a small exhibition at the Sheraton Hotel in Kuwait. It was an immediate success and he returned in 1971, when his three-week stay earned enough money to see him through the crippling economic downturn which marked the beginning of that year. The intense sunlight of the Middle East drove him to be much bolder with his use of colours. The Islamic tiles and decorations he encountered on these trips were another source of new ideas.

Another great (if unlikely) influence on John Donald's work originates much closer to home. The quintessentially modern designer has studied Victorian jewellery, admiring its 'intricate, thoughtful and honestly decorative' style. As a young student at the Royal College of Art he spent time looking at the Victoria and Albert Museum's extensive collection of 19th century jewels. Their elegant natural shapes and attention to detail find echoes in many of his pieces, especially those which employ ingenious movable or interchangeable parts.

Brooches

Brooches were the first pieces of jewellery made by John Donald using his innovative new techniques, and they launched his career as an artist-jeweller, several examples representing his work at the 1961 International Exhibition of Modern Jewellery. The straight forward way in which brooches are worn gives maximum scope for experimentation, and as a result he has always had a special fondness for this versatile ornament.

Such creative freedom means that some of his most important ideas can be traced through brooch design. Growth forms, including minute organisms and minerals have been a theme informing his work from the very beginning. The young John Donald was one of the first jewellers to use uncut crystals, studying specimens in the Natural History Museum. The dramatic, baroque expression of many examples reveals a wholly different influence: a travelling scholarship he took to Italy in 1955. Here he absorbed the energy' and drama of the country's treasures.

But no matter how diverse, his brooches (like all his work) are united by two overarching concerns. The first is for the balance and integrity of his designs.
According to John Donald 'all stones, however valuable, however beautiful, must be subordinate to design'. The second is for their relationship with the wearer. He has always maintained that 'I am very aware that my pieces are to be worn, and when working on commissioned objects, always take into account, not only the appearance but the personality of the wearer'.

Out of the City and into the future

For 37 years the Cheapside shop occupied a unique place in the City of London. The modern financial centre has its roots in the many goldsmiths workshops which populated the area in past centuries, and as the only working goldsmith within the City's boundaries, John Donald provided an important link with these historic origins.

This significant position was cemented by his very traditional role in creating pieces for the City's Livery' Companies. John Donald has designed official regalia since the outset of his career, producing his very first badge in 1956 whilst still a student at the Royal College of Art. His first significant commission as an independent jeweller was to make three Warden's Badges for the Goldsmiths' Company. He was awarded the project in 1960, after winning a limited competition whose brief was to combine contemporary design with the Company's ancient heraldic motifs.

Since then he has made over 120 official badges, all of which echo the skillful integration of old and new seen on this early example. Years of experience have also made him aware of not only the aesthetic but also the practical requirements of such pieces. Many are taken for repair after spending an eventful night tucked in the back pocket of a returning official, so his designs are robust as well as attractive.

The City lost its last goldsmith in 2005, when re-development led to the closure of the 120 Cheapside shop. However John Donald's contribution to the world of precious metals is certainly far from over; he is still driven with a passion for making beautiful objects, and has planned a very active 'semi-retirement' working on specially commissioned pieces. It is this desire for the hands-on experience of creation which has made his work so distinctive. A consummate craftsman, he has always been dedicated to producing things by hand, believing in the importance of experimenting as a piece is made.

John Donald claims that there have been no ‘eureka’ moments in his career, that his designs have instead evolved slowly over time. This gradual distillation of ideas has enabled him to continue to innovate so that even now, when his early work is being sold as prestigious antiques, his jewellery displays an undeniable feeling of modernity.

References

Living people
British jewellery designers
British jewellers
1928 births